The Leica SL2 is a full-frame mirrorless interchangeable-lens camera released by Leica Camera on 6 November 2019. The camera uses the Leica L-Mount lenses range and is part of the L-Mount Alliance of camera bodies that Leica co-developed with Panasonic and Sigma.

The camera has 47 MP full frame CMOS sensor with sensor-shift image stabilization built into the camera. With this technology the camera can move the sensor in order to produce 187 MP images. The Leica SL2 succeeded the Leica SL (Typ 601). The camera's body has been completely redesigned, with altered ergonomics, new buttons and touchscreen. The camera's touchscreen liquid-crystal display is now 3.2" in size with 2.1 million dots, while the electronic viewfinder's resolution has been boosted to 5.76 million dots. The new Maestro III processor allows for faster AF than its predecessor as well as 20 fps burst shooting with the electronic shutter or 10 fps with the mechanical shutter. The camera has two SD card slots, both of which are compatible with high-speed UHS-II media. The camera has earned the IP54 rating for weather-sealing. The Leica SL2 can also capture DCI and UHD 4K resolution video at 60 frames/sec and up to 180 fps in Full HD mode. When placed into 'Cine' mode, the terminology and displays on the SL2 become video-specific. The Leica SL2 has both microphone and headphone sockets, as well as a full-size HDMI port.

References

External links

SL2
Cameras introduced in 2019
Full-frame mirrorless interchangeable lens cameras